The Wibault Wib 210 C.1 was a single engine, single seat low wing monoplane fighter aircraft, designed and built in France in the late 1920s. Flight tests revealed vibration problems and development was quickly abandoned.

Design and development
The Wib 210 was designed in response to a 1928 Service Technique de l'Aéronautique (S.T.Aé, Technical Department of Aeronautics) single-seat fighter (C.1) programme.  Like the Wib 170 Tornarde, which was being developed at the same time, it was a lightweight aircraft (chasseur légere) but as a low wing cantilever monoplane it ended decisively Wibault's long series of parasol wing fighters. Their proposal won them an order for two prototypes.

Like earlier Wibault designs, the Wib 210 was an all-metal aircraft with a largely Duralumin structure and clad with narrow aluminium strips applied longitudinally. Its wings, mounted with mild dihedral, were straight edged and tapered with blunt wing tips. Full span ailerons were fitted.  The triangular tailplane carried split elevators and the fin was angular, with a swept leading edge and square tip, bearing a rudder which extended down between the elevators to the keel.

The fuselage was flat sided with rounded decking; the single open cockpit was situated just ahead of the wing trailing edge. The Wib 210 was powered by an upright, liquid cooled V-12 Hispano-Suiza 12Hb driving a two bladed propeller.  This was closely cowled, following the profiles of the two banks of cylinders individually. A rectangular radiator, as wide as the fuselage, was placed under the wing between the undercarriage legs. The fixed, conventional undercarriage was of the split axle type, with the axles fixed to the centre of the fuselage underside and the mainwheels mounted on V-struts. There was a small tailskid. The Wib 210 was armed with a pair of 7.7 mm (0.303 in) synchronised machine guns firing through the propeller arc.

Flight testing began at Villacoublay late in April 1929 but the first flight revealed a serious vibration problem in the rear fuselage and empennage. The Wib 210 was modified and returned to the air at the end of the next month. In consequence development ended.

Specifications

References

Bibliography

1920s French fighter aircraft
Wib 210
Single-engined tractor aircraft
Low-wing aircraft